The Tagalog people (Baybayin: ᜋᜅ ᜆᜄᜎᜓᜄ᜔) are the largest ethnolinguistic group in the Philippines, numbering at around 30 million. An Austronesian people, the Tagalog have a well developed society due to their cultural heartland, Manila, being the capital city of the Philippines. They are native to the Metro Manila and Calabarzon regions of southern Luzon, and comprise the majority in the provinces of Bulacan, Bataan, Nueva Ecija and Aurora in Central Luzon and in the islands of Marinduque and Mindoro in Mimaropa.

Etymology

The commonly perpetuated origin for the endonym "Tagalog" is the term tagá-ilog, which means "people from [along] the river" (the prefix tagá- meaning "coming from" or "native of"). However, this explanation is a mistranslation of the correct term tagá-álog, which means "people from the ford".

Historical usage 
Before the colonial period, the term "Tagalog" was originally used to differentiate river dwellers (taga-ilog) from mountain dwellers (taga-bundok, less common tingues) between Nagcarlan and Lamon Bay, despite speaking the same language. Further exceptions include the present-day Batangas Tagalogs, who referred to themselves as people of Kumintang - a distinction formally maintained throughout the colonial period.

Allegiance to a bayan differentiated between its natives called tawo and foreigners, who either also spoke Tagalog or other languages - the latter called samot or samok.

Beginning in the Spanish colonial period, documented foreign spellings of the term ranged from Tagalos to Tagalor.

History

Prehistory and origins 

Like the majority of Filipinos, the Tagalog people primarily descend from seafaring Austronesians who migrated southwards to the Philippine islands from the island of Taiwan some 4,000 years ago. Contact with the much earlier Negritos resulted in a gradually developed scenario seen throughout the Philippine archipelago of coastal, lowland, predominantly Austronesian-speaking seafaring settlements and land-based Negrito hunter-gatherers confined to forested and mountainous inlands, along with inland Austronesians oriented towards rivers. Both groups variably mixed with each other from millennia of general coexistence, yet even up to Spanish advent social distinctions between them still remained.

As Filipinos, the Tagalogs are related to the Austronesian-speaking peoples of present-day Taiwan, Malaysia, Brunei, and Indonesia, and the more distant Micronesians, Polynesians, and Malagasy.

Specific origin narratives of the Tagalog people contend among several theories:
 Eastern Visayas - Research on the Philippine languages hypothesize a Greater Central Philippine subfamily that includes, among others, the Bisayan languages and Tagalog, the latter vaguely assumed to have originated somewhere in the eastern Visayas.
 Borneo via Panay - The controversial Maragtas dates events from around the early 13th century, which tells of a great migration of ten datus and their followers somewhere from Borneo northwards and subsequent settlements in Panay, escaping the tyranny of their Bornean overlord, Rajah Makatunaw. Sometime later, three datus Kalengsusu, Puti, and Dumaksol sailed back from Panay to Borneo, then intended to make return for Panay before blowing off course further north to the Taal river area in present-day Batangas. Datu Puti continued to Panay, while Kalengsusu and Dumaksol decided to settle there with their barangay followings, thus the story says is the origin of the Tagalogs.
 Sumatra or Java - A twin migration of Tagalog and Kapampangan peoples from either somewhere in Sumatra or Java in present-day Indonesia. Dates unknown, but this theory holds the least credibility regardless for basing these migrations from the outdated out-of-Sundaland model of the Austronesian expansion.

Barangay period 

Tagalog and other Philippine histories in general are highly speculative before the 10th century, primarily due to lack of written sources. Most information on precolonial Tagalog culture is documented by observational writings by early Spanish explorers in the mid-16th century, alongside few precedents from indirect Portuguese accounts and archaeological finds.

The maritime oriented barangays of pre-Hispanic Tagalogs is shared with other coastal peoples throughout the Philippine archipelago. The roughly three-tiered Tagalog social structure of maginoo (royalty), timawa/maharlika (freemen usually of lower nobility), and alipin (bondsmen, slaves, debt peons) have almost identical cognates in Visayan, Sulu, and Mindanawon societies. Most barangays were networked almost exclusively by sea traffic, while smaller scale inland trade was typified as lowlander-highlander affairs. Barangays, like other Philippine settlements elsewhere, practiced seasonal sea raiding for vengeance, slaves, and valuables alongside headhunting, except for the relatively larger suprabarangay bayan of the Pasig River delta that served as a hub for slave trading. Such specialization also applied to other large towns like Cebu, Butuan, Jolo, and Cotabato.

Tagalog barangays, especially around Manila Bay, were typically larger than most Philippine polities due to a largely flat geography of their environment hosting extensive irrigated rice agriculture (then a prestigious commodity) and particularly close trade relations with Brunei, Malacca, China (sangley), Siam, Champa, and Japan, from direct proximity to the South China Sea tradewinds. Such characteristics gave early Spanish impressions of Tagalogs as "more traders than warriors," although raids were practiced. Neighboring Kapampangan barangays also shared these characteristics.

10th-13th centuries 

Although at the periphery of the larger Maritime Silk Road like much of Borneo, Sulawesi and eastern Indonesia, notable influences from Hinduism and Buddhism were brought to southwest Luzon and other parts of the Philippine archipelago by largely intermediate Bornean, Malay, Cham, and Javanese traders by this time period, likely much earlier. The earliest document in Tagalog and general Philippine history is the Laguna copperplate inscription (LCI), bearing several place names speculated to be analogous to several towns and barangays in predominantly Tagalog areas ranging from present-day Bulacan to coastal Mindoro.

The text is primarily in Old Malay and shows several cultural and societal insights into the Tagalogs during time period. The earliest recognized Tagalog polity is Tondo, mentioned as Tundun, while several other place names are theorized to be present-day Pila or Paila, Bulacan (Pailah), Pulilan (Puliran), and Binuangan. Sanskrit, Malay, and Tagalog honorifics, names, accounting, and timekeeping were used. Chiefs were referred as either pamagat or tuhan, while dayang was likely female royalty. All aforementioned polities seem to have close relations elsewhere with the polities of Dewata and Mdang, theorized to be present-day area of Butuan in Mindanao and the Mataram Kingdom in Java.

Additionally, several records from Song China and Brunei mention a particular polity called Ma-i, the earliest in 971. Several places within Tagalog-speaking areas contend for its location: Bulalacao (formerly Mait), Bay, and Malolos. Ma-i had close trade relations with the Song, directly importing manufactured wares, iron, and jewelry and retailing to "other islands," evident of earlier possible Tagalog predominance of resaling Chinese goods throughout the rest of the Philippine islands before its expicit role by Maynila in the 16th century.

15th-16th centuries: Malacca and Brunei affairs 

The growth of the Malacca as the largest Southeast Asian entrepôt in the Maritime Silk Road led to a gradual spread of its cultural influence eastward throughout insular Southeast Asia. Malay became the regional lingua franca of trade and many polities enculturated Islamic Malay customs and governance to varying degrees, including Tagalogs and other coastal Philippine peoples. According to Bruneian folklore, at around 1500 Sultan Bolkiah launched a successful northward expedition to break Tondo’s monopoly as a regional entrepot of the Chinese trade and established Maynila (Selurong?) across the Pasig delta, ruled by his heirs as a satellite. Subsequently Bruneian influence spread elsewhere around Manila Bay, present-day Batangas, and coastal Mindoro through closer trade and political relations, with a growing Tagalog-Kapampangan diaspora based in Brunei and beyond in Malacca in various professions as traders, sailors, shipbuilders, mercenaries, governors, and slaves.

The Pasig delta bayan of Tondo-Maynila was the largest entrepot within the Philippine archipelago primarily from retailing Chinese and Japanese manufactured goods and wares throughout Luzon, the Visayan islands (where Bisaya would mistakenly called Tagalog and Bornean traders alike as Sina), Palawan, Sulu, and Maguindanao. Tagalog (or Kapampangan) traders also worked elsewhere as far as Timor and Canton. Bruneian, Malay, Chinese, Japanese, Siamese, Khmer, Cham, and traders from the rest of the Philippine archipelago alike all conducted business in Maynila, and to a lesser extent along the Batangas and Mindoro coasts. However, in a broader scope of Southeast Asian trade the bayan served a niche regional market comparable to smaller trade towns in Borneo, Sualwesi, and Maluku.

Spanish colonial period

1565-1815: Galleon era 
On May 19, 1571, Miguel López de Legazpi gave the title "city" to the colony of Manila. The title was certified on June 19, 1572. Under Spain, Manila became the colonial entrepot in the Far East. The Philippines was a Spanish colony administered under the Viceroyalty of New Spain and the Governor-General of the Philippines who ruled from Manila was sub-ordinate to the Viceroy in Mexico City. Throughout the 333 years of Spanish rule, various grammars and dictionaries were written by Spanish clergymen, including Vocabulario de la lengua tagala by Pedro de San Buenaventura (Pila, Laguna, 1613), Pablo Clain's Vocabulario de la lengua tagala (beginning of the 18th century), Vocabulario de la lengua tagala (1835), and Arte de la lengua tagala y manual tagalog para la administración de los Santos Sacramentos (1850) in addition to early studies of the language. The first substantial dictionary of Tagalog language was written by the Czech Jesuit missionary Pablo Clain in the beginning of the 18th century. Further compilation of his substantial work was prepared by P. Juan de Noceda and P. Pedro de Sanlucar and published as Vocabulario de la lengua tagala in Manila in 1754 and then repeatedly re-edited, with the last edition being in 2013 in Manila. The indigenous poet Francisco Baltazar (1788–1862) is regarded as the foremost Tagalog writer, his most notable work being the early 19th-century epic Florante at Laura.

Prior to Spanish arrival and Catholic seeding, the ancient Tagalog people used to cover the following: present-day Calabarzon region except the Polillo Islands, northern Quezon, Alabat island, the Bondoc Peninsula, and easternmost Quezon; Marinduque; Bulacan except for its eastern part; and southwest Nueva Ecija, as much of Nueva Ecija used to be a vast rainforest where numerous nomadic ethnic groups stayed and left. When the polities of Tondo and Maynila fell due to the Spanish, the Tagalog-majority areas grew through Tagalog migrations in portions of Central Luzon and north Mimaropa as a Tagalog migration policy was implemented by Spain. This was continued by the Americans when they defeated Spain in a war.

The first documented Asian-origin people to arrive in North America after the beginning of European colonization were a group of Filipinos known as "Luzonians" or Luzon Indians who were part of the crew and landing party of the Spanish galleon Nuestra Señora de la Buena Esperanza. The ship set sail from Macau and landed in Morro Bay in what is now the California coast on October 17, 1587, as part of the Galleon Trade between the Spanish East Indies (the colonial name for what would become the Philippines) and New Spain (Spain's Viceroyalty in North America). More Filipino sailors arrived along the California coast when both places were part of the Spanish Empire. By 1763, "Manila men" or "Tagalas" had established a settlement called St. Malo on the outskirts of New Orleans, Louisiana.

The Tagalog people played an active role during the 1896 Philippine Revolution and many of its leaders were either from Manila or surrounding provinces. The first Filipino president was Tagalog creole Emilio Aguinaldo. The Katipunan once intended to name the Philippines as Katagalugan, or the Tagalog Republic, and extended the meaning of these terms to all natives in the Philippine islands. Miguel de Unamuno described Filipino propagandist José Rizal (1861–1896) as the "Tagalog Hamlet" and said of him “a soul that dreads the revolution although deep down desires it. He pivots between fear and hope, between faith and despair.” In 1902, Macario Sakay formed his own Republika ng Katagalugan in the mountains of Morong (today, the province of Rizal), and held the presidency with Francisco Carreón as vice president.

1821-1901 

Tagalog was declared the official language by the first constitution in the Philippines, the Constitution of Biak-na-Bato in 1897. In 1935, the Philippine constitution designated English and Spanish as official languages, but mandated the development and adoption of a common national language based on one of the existing native languages. After study and deliberation, the National Language Institute, a committee composed of seven members who represented various regions in the Philippines, chose Tagalog as the basis for the evolution and adoption of the national language of the Philippines. President Manuel L. Quezon then, on December 30, 1937, proclaimed the selection of the Tagalog language to be used as the basis for the evolution and adoption of the national language of the Philippines. In 1939, President Quezon renamed the proposed Tagalog-based national language as wikang pambansâ (national language). In 1959, the language was further renamed as "Pilipino". The 1973 constitution designated the Tagalog-based "Pilipino", along with English, as an official language and mandated the development and formal adoption of a common national language to be known as Filipino. The 1987 constitution designated Filipino as the national language mandating that as it evolves, it shall be further developed and enriched on the basis of existing Philippine and other languages.

Culture and society
The Tagalog number around 30 million, making them the largest indigenous Filipino ethno-linguistic group in the country. The second largest is the Sebwano with around 20 million. Tagalog settlements are generally lowland, commonly oriented towards banks near the delta or wawà (mouth of a river). Culturally, it is rare for native Tagalog people to identify themselves as Tagalog as part of their collective identity as an ethnolinguistic group due to cultural differences, specialization, and geographical isolation. The native masses commonly identify their native cultural group by provinces, such as Batangueño, Bulakenyo, and Marindukanon, or by towns, such as Lukbanin, Tayabasin, and Infantahin. Likewise, most cultural aspects of the Tagalog people orient towards decentralized specializations of provinces and towns.

Naming customs 
(This section is for contemporary practices)

Historical customs 
Tagalog naming customs have changed over the centuries. The 17th Century Spanish missionary, Fr. Francisco Colin, wrote in his work, Labor Evangelica about the naming customs of Tagalogs during the precolonial times up to the early decades of Spanish colonial era. Colin mentioned that Tagalog infants were given names as soon as they were born, it is the mother's business to give them names.

Generally, the name is taken from the circumstances at the time of birth. In his work, Fr. Colin gave an example on how names are given:For example, Maliuag, which means “difficult,” because of the difficulty of the birth; Malacas, which signifies “strong,” for it is thought that the infant will be strong. This is like the custom of the Hebrews, as appears from Holy Writ. At other times the name was given without any hidden meaning, from the first thing that struck the fancy, as Daan, which signifies “road,” and Damo, signifying “grass.” They were called by those names, without the use of any surname, until they were married.Surname is only given upon the birth of one's first child. Fathers add Amani (Ama ni in mod. Tagalog) while mothers add Ynani (Ina ni in mod. Tagalog), these names precede the infant's name which acts as the surname. Historical samples of this are two of those who are involved in the failed Tondo Conspiracy in 1587; Felipe Amarlangagui (Ama ni Langkawi), one of the chiefs of Tondo, and Don Luis Amanicalao (Ama ni Kalaw), his son, Calao, was also involved in the plot. Later, in a document dated December 5, 1625, a certain man named Amadaha was said to be a father of a principalía named Doña Maria Gada. Fr. Colin mentioned that it's a practice among Tagalogs to add -in to female names to differentiate them from men. He also provides an example of this in his work:Then the first son or daughter gave the surname to the parents, as Amani Maliuag, Ynani Malacas, “the father of Maliuag,” “the mother of Malacas.” The names of women are differentiated from those of men by adding the syllable “in,” as Ilog, “river;” Si Ilog, the name of a male; Si Iloguin, the name of a female.He proceeds to give notes about the intricacies of Tagalog society and language, reflected by the customs of its people:They used very tender diminutives for the children, in our manner. Among themselves they had certain domestic and delicate appellations of various sorts for the different degrees of relationship—as that of a child for his father and mother, and vice versa. In the same way [they have appellations] for their ancestors, descendants, and collaterals. This shows the abundance, elegance, and courtesy of this language [Tagalog].By the time Fr. Colin wrote his work in 1600s, Tagalogs have mainly converted to Roman Catholic Christianity from the old religions of anito worship and Islam. He noted that some mothers have become devout Catholics that they won't give a native secular name until baptism. Upon conversion, the single names of the old had become the people's surnames and they add a Christian name as their first name. In addition, Fr. Colin further notes that Tagalogs quickly adopted the Spanish practice of adding "Don" for prestige, which in olden times, they would have used Lacan (Lakan) or Gat for men, while Dayang is added for women.In place of our “Don” (which indeed has been assigned to them with as much abuse as among ourselves), in some districts they formerly placed before their names, Lacan or Gat: as the Moluccans use Cachil, the Africans Muley, the Turks Sultan, etc. The “Don” of the women is not Lacan or Gat, but Dayang, Dayang Mati, Dayang Sanguy, i.e., “Doña Mati,” “Doña Sanguy.”In Tagalog society, it was considered distasteful and embarrassing to explicitly mention one another among themselves by their own names alone, adding something is seen as an act of courtesy. This manifests in the practice of adding Amani or Ynani before the first child's name. For those people of influence but without children, his relatives and acquaintances would throw a banquet where a new name would be given to the person, this new name is called pamagat. The name given is based on the person's old name but reflects excellence and is metaphorical. Fr. Colin also gives an example for this:Thus if one was called by his own name, Bacal, which signifies “iron,” the new name given him would be Dimatanassan, signifying “not to spoil with time.” If it were Bayani, which signifies “valiant” and “spirited,” he was called Dimalapitan “he to whom no one is bold.”Another peculiar practice among Tagalogs is the custom of calling one another based on a special circumstance, as a way of friendship. Fr. Colin elaborates it in his work:It is also the custom among these nations to call one another among themselves, by way of friendship, by certain correlative names based on some special circumstance. Thus if one had given a branch of sweet basil to another, the two among themselves called each other Casolasi, the name of the thing given; or Caytlog, he who ate of an egg with another. This is in the manner of the names of fellow-students or chums as used by us. These are all arguments in favor of the civilization of these Indians.

Cuisine and dining customs

Tagalog cuisine is not defined ethnically or in centralized culinary institutions, but instead by town, province, or even region with specialized dishes developed largely at homes or various kinds of restaurants. Nonetheless, there are fundamental characteristics largely shared with most of the Philippines:

 rice is the primary staple food, while tuber are typically prepared as vegetables
 varying combinations of palm vinegar, soy sauce, calamansi, chilis, garlic, and onions in most dishes
 prominence of seafood and pork, along with other usual meats of poultry and beef 
 panaderias or neighborhood bakeries inherited from Hispanic culture

Bulacan is known for chicharon (fried pork rinds), steamed rice and tuber cakes like puto, panghimagas (desserts), like suman, sapin-sapin, ube halaya, kutsinta, cassava cake, and pastillas de leche. Rizal is also known for its suman and cashew products. Laguna is known for buko pie and panutsa. Batangas is home to Taal Lake, home to 75 species of freshwater fish. Among these, the maliputo and tawilis are unique local delicacies. Batangas is also known for kapeng barako, lomi, bulalo, and goto. Bistek Tagalog is a dish of strips of sirloin beef slowly cooked in soy sauce, calamansi juice, vinegar and onions. Records have also shown that kare-kare is the Tagalog dish that the Spanish first tasted when they landed in pre-colonial Tondo.

Dining customs and etiquette

Outlets 

Aside from panaderias, numerous roadside eateries serve local specialities. Batangas is home to many lomihan, gotohan, and bulalohan.

Literature

Secular 
The Tagalog people are also known for their tanaga, an indigenous artistic poetic form of the Tagalog people's idioms, feelings, teachings, and ways of life. The tanaga strictly has four lines only, each having seven syllables only.

Bugtong = riddle

Awit = dodecasyllabic quatrain romance

Korido = ocotsyllabic quatrain romance

Religious 
Dalit = verses of novenas/catechisms: no fixed metre or rhyme, though some in octosyllabic quatrains

Pasyon = prose in octosyllabic quintillas commemorating Christ’s resurrection

Dialogo

Manual de Urbanidad

Tratado

Musical and performing arts 
(This section is for contemporary period)

Historical precedences

Precolonial 
Not much is known of precolonial Tagalog music, though Spanish-Tagalog dictionaries like Vocabulario de la lengua tagala in the early colonial period noted of Tagalog words for some musical instruments, such as agung/agong (gong), bangsi (flute), and kudyapi/cutyapi/coryapi (boat lute), the last one was further described by the Spanish chronicler Fr. Pedro Chirino in his Relación de las Islas Filipinas, which had long faded into obscurity among modern Tagalogs. In his entry, he mentioned:In polite and affectionate intercourse, [the Tagalos] are very extravagant, addressing letters to each other in terms of elaborate and delicate expressions of affection, and neat turns of thought. As a result of this, they are much given to musical practice; and although the guitar that they use, called cutyapi, is not very ingenious or rich in tone, it is by no means disagreeable, and to them is most pleasing. They play it with such vivacity and skill that they seem to make human voices issue from its four metallic cords. We also have it on good authority that by merely playing these instruments they can, without opening their lips, communicate with one another, and make themselves perfectly understood – a thing unknown of any other nation...” (Chirino 1604a: 241).

Spanish colonial 
During the 333 years of Spanish colonization, Tagalogs began to use Western musical instruments. Local adaptations have led to new instruments like the 14-string bandurria and octavina, both of which are part of the rondalla ensemble.

There are several types of Tagalog folk songs or awit according to Spanish records, differing on the general theme of the words as well as meter.

 Awit - house songs; also a generic term for "song"
 Diona - wedding songs
 Indolanin and umbay - sad songs 
 Talingdao - work songs
 Umiguing - songs sung in a slow tempo with trilling vocals
 Sea shanties:
 Dolayinin - oar rowing songs
 Soliranin - sailing songs
 Manigpasin - refrains sung during paddling
 Hila and dopayinin - other kinds of boat songs
 Balicungcung - manner of singing in boats
 Haloharin, oyayi and hele-hele - lullabies
 Sambotani - songs for festivals and social reunions
 Tagumpay - songs to commemorate victory in ware
 Hilirao - drinking songs
 Kumintang - love songs; also a pantomimic "dance song" - Dr. F. Santiago
 kundiman - love songs; used especially in serenading

Many of these traditional songs were not well documented and were largely passed down orally, and persisted in rural Tagalog regions well into 20th century.

American occupation

Visual arts
The Tagalog people were also craftsmen. The katolanan, specifically, of each barangay is tasked as the holder of arts and culture, and usually trains craftfolks if ever no craftfolks are living in the barangay. If the barangay has a craftsfolk, the present crafts-folks would teach their crafts to gifted students. Notable crafts made by ancient Tagalogs are boats, fans, agricultural materials, livestock instruments, spears, arrows, shields, accessories, jewelries, clothing, houses, paddles, fish gears, mortar and pestles, food utensils, musical instruments, bamboo and metal wears for inscribing messages, clay wears, toys, and many others.

Wood and bambooworking 

Paete, Baliuag furniture, Taal furniture, precolonial boat building, joinery, and woodcarving (Paete carving, Pakil woodshaving and whittling)

Singkaban 

Tagalog provinces practice a traditional art called singkaban, a craft that involves shaving and curling bamboo through the use of sharp metal tools. This process is called kayas in Tagalog. Kayas requires patience as the process involves shaving off the bamboo by thin layers, creating curls and twirls to produce decorations.

This art is mostly associated with the town of Hagonoy, Bulacan, though it is also practiced in southern Tagalog provinces like Rizal and Laguna. It primarily serves as decoration during town festivals, usually applied on arches that decorate the streets and alleyways during the festivities.

Weaving 

Notable Tagalog weaving customs include:
Taal and Lumban embroidery
Basketry
Palaspas palm weaving

Clothing 

The majority of Tagalogs before colonization wore garments woven by the locals, much of which showed sophisticated designs and techniques. The Boxer Codex also illuminates the intricate and high standard in Tagalog clothing, especially among the gold-draped high society. High society members, which include the datu and the katolonan, also wore accessories made of prized materials. Slaves on the other hand wore simple clothing, seldom loincloths.

During later centuries, Tagalog nobles would wear the barong tagalog for men and the baro't saya for women. When the Philippines became independent, the barong tagalog became popularised as the national costume of the country, as the wearers were the majority in the new capital, Manila.

Metalworking 
Metalworking is one of the most prominent trades of precolonial Tagalog, noted for the abundance of terms recorded in Vocabulario de la Lengua Tagala that is related to metalworking, signifying a sophisticated practice of this art which has died down during the colonial period.

Goldworking 
Goldworking in particular is of considerable significance among the Tagalogs, gold (Sp. oro) was mentioned in 228 entries in Vocabulario de la Lengua Tagala. In 16th Century Tagalog region, the region of Paracale (modern-day Camarines Norte) was noted for its abundance in gold. Paracale is connected to the archipelago's main entrepot, Manila, through the Tayabas province and Pila, Laguna.

The Tagalog term for gold, still in use today, is ginto. The craftsman who works on metal is called panday bakal (metalsmith), but those who specialize in goldworks are called panday ginto (goldsmith).

For gold procurement, Tagalogs get the ores from mines which are called dolang (dulang in mod. Tagalog) and dulangan for places where gold or metal ores can be acquired in general, not restricted to mines. Dulangan is also used as tool for acquiring such gold like wooden pans. These raw gold ores are distinguished between two types, the gintong buo (large gold) and gintong wagas (gold dusts and bits).

Material processing involves wisak (coal) which is used for heating, San Buenaventura further elaborates that this is a specific type of coal, one that "cannot melt the Chinese gold or silver with", it is used for reduction or addition sequences. Raw materials are called wagas (gold dusts and bits), pilak (silver) and tumbaga (copper). Tumbaga is also defined as "combining of gold and copper", thus transforming the color to red. The terms for processes are ilik (heating and melting), sangag (purifying and refining), sumbat (combining gold and silver) which turns the metal into white, subong (combining gold, silver and copper) and piral (bonding with silver or copper). These are done with tools called sangagan and patutunawan (pot, crucible). These processes may produce lata (soft gold), buo (large gold), mistula (pure, unalloyed gold).

For forming, produced metal works may undergo hibo (forming, gilding), alat-at or gitang (splitting), tungmatatak (tumatatak in mod. Tagalog) which is a delicate process of cutting, batbat or talag (hammering), lantay (beating), batak (stretching), pilipit (twisting), binubo (fusing), hinang (soldering), and piral (bonding with silver or copper). All of these processes are done with pamatbat, panalag (hammer), panlantay (beating instrument). These processes results into tatak (workable gold cuts) and lantay (gold foil), left over gold bits that are of little worth are called unbit/umbit and torn gold is lamok.

The resulting tatak and lantay from the previous process are then taken for designing phase. Gems, jewels and aromatics can also be used as additional embellishments. A Tagalog goldsmith can do design on these golds with dawa-dawa (styling and filigree work) which enhances the visual appeal, kinang (lustre) or dalag are the most adored qualities of gold in Tagalog society. Sapo or dungmadalag (dumaralag in mod. Tagalog) for polishing, they do this by rubbing in ochre to increase is reddish color. Baid or naynay are the terms for burnishing, bitang (sleek styling), tukol (chiselling), kalupkop (garnishing), salak (accessorizing with gems or aromatics). The tools that goldsmith uses are called pamaid (polishing instrument) and panukol (chisel). These results into finished works like gold ornaments, jewelleries and other gold objects.

In assaying or reworking gold ornaments, one can do uri (assaying) with tools such as urian (magnet, touchstone) and karay (weighing container). As such, precolonial Tagalogs can discern the fake gold called balat from the genuine gold which are called tunay.

After assaying the gold, Tagalogs would test its quality, Vocabulario made mention of the quality spectrum of gold as it was referred to during the early 1600s. Dalisay is the highest spectrum with 24 karats, followed by ginugulan with 22 karats, next would be hilapo for 20 karats, panangbo for less than 20 karats, panika with 18 karats, linging-in with 14 karats, and bislig with only 12 karats. Malubay and hutok are defined as almost copper, gold with the lowest quality which may mean that it's below 10 karats. Each category is further divided into two, matanda and bata, a step superior and inferior than it; a hilapong bata is not straightforward hilapo (20 karats) while a bislig matanda is short of being straightforward lingin-in (14 karats).

For final use of such gold ornaments, they usually end up being buried (baon) with the dead or made use as heirloom or inheritance (mana, malaking ginto).

Bladesmithing 
Tagalogs have a long tradition in bladesmithing, with itak (bolo) having historical importance as symbol strongly associated with Philippine Revolution as these farm implements were converted into fighting blades during this turbulent period. Vocabulario de la Lengua Tagala recorded several Tagalog terms for specific type of blades, some of which were later replaced by Spanish loanword or has fell into obscurity; kalis was the term for "sword", which has been replaced in modern Tagalog by the Spanish loanword espada, kampilan and talibong were the terms for "cutlass", while gulok, sundang, itak and tabak were generic terms for agricultural blades, which can have different length and blade profiles.

Bladesmithing is traditionally learned through apprenticeship. A blacksmith (panday) will take a young apprentice, and this young apprentice starts off assisting the blacksmith in the forging process, as well as scabbard making, they will do this until they are well-equipped to start their own forge. In present-day, bladesmthing, hilt and scabbard making can be done in the forge by blacksmiths, although there are also blacksmiths who don't make scabbards and would delegate the task to craftsmen (either a woodworker or leatherworker) who specialize in scabbard making. There are also specialized craftsmen who make pamigkis or the strap used as belts to tie up the scabbard to the user's hips.

There were no descriptions on what pre-colonial Tagalog blades look like, nor their specific shapes or the materials used. The ones that survived to this day are from Spanish-era, which demonstrates the use of wood or carabao horn for hilts, laminated blades were also found albeit not as common as their counterparts in Mindanao. Brass fittings were also found in both antiques and modern samples especially on ferrules (sakla) and pommels (bitling). For scabbards (kaluban), carabao leather were noted in earlier samples and persists in some towns in Laguna to this day, but the rest of Tagalog provinces shifted into using wooden scabbards. For hilts (puluhan), carabao horn is the preferred material in Rizal, Laguna and Quezon provinces, while wood is preferred elsewhere.

In present-day, there are still thriving bladesmithing traditions in the rural parts of Rizal, Laguna, Mindoro, Marinduque and Quezon provinces. Bataan, Bulacan and Cavite blacksmiths mainly concentrate on mass-produced and cheaper blades that are normally sold in Sunday markets and shipped to various parts of the country, two known forgers are the SH and SK forges in Carmona, Cavite. Traditional blacksmithing of long blades in Batangas has largely died out and intricate pieces are only preserved as heirlooms, as most longer blades have shifted into the more plain-looking farm implements similar to the neighboring Cavite. In other hand, balisong-making is still alive and thriving in the town of Taal, Batangas.

In modern-day Tagalog regions, there are several types of blade profiles that persisted in rural areas. These blades may differ on nomenclature, shapes, and other designs, but nevertheless the general terms and materials are fairly consistent among different Tagalog provinces. Some of these are the following:

 Dahong palay - the name literally means "rice leaf", although it is also a local name for Philippine pit viper. A sword that is most commonly associated with Tagalog people. The usual blade length can range from 38 cm (15 inches) up to 76 cm (30 inches). There are at least two types of blade profiles for dahong palay and it can vary depending on the area or even among the blacksmiths. It is also called dinahong palay and rinahong palay in some provinces.
 Sungot ulang/hipon - literally means "shrimp/lobster snout". This short sword is also one of the more common blade profiles among Tagalogs, defined by the false edge at the spine that starts midway through the blade, this false edge slightly bends downwards to the tip. Its blade profile can also have some subtle differences depending on the blacksmith. Sometimes it is also called sinungot ulang/hipon.
 Dahong buho - literally means "bamboo leaf". This bolo is similar to dahong palay, but usually has wider belly that can sometimes look similar to the Tausug barong. This blade is most common in the eastern towns of Laguna.
 Balisong - a knife that originated from Barangay Balisong in Taal, Batangas where many of its traditional craftsmen are based. It is one of the most popular traditional blades in the country, popularized in media and has gained notoriety as preferred weapon by thugs and criminals. Traditional blade profiles are labaha, debuyod, tari, kris among others. The typical length is of 29 cm (11 inches), normally called as bentenueve. Another type is busese, its blade is much longer than its handles, exposing half of the blade even if folded. A more recent, and longer version of balisong is balisword, albeit it's mostly for novelty and usually not functional.
 Uhas tari - a sword that can also be found in Bicol Region where it is called wastari. It is generally more slender than dahong palay, with its blade slightly curving downwards towards the tip. It goes by myriad of names, it is also called ohas tari, hustari/hinustari, tinari, hiwas tari, bastari, huwas tari, etc. depending on the town or province.
 Binakoko - a knife that is mostly common in Rizal province. The usual blade length can vary from 25 cm (10 inches) up to 41 cm (16 inches). There are two known types in Rizal province; binakokong matanda which is the classic, wider version of binakoko, and the slender and slightly pointed binakokong bata also occasionally called kinabase in the province. In other Tagalog provinces, binakoko can also be used interchangeably with sinampalok and kabase/kinabase.
 Sinanduki - a small knife that is only made in the town of Binangonan in Rizal province. It has a clip point that starts mid-way through the blade. The normal blade lengths are around 23 cm (9-10 inches), though there are samples that are as long as 40 cm (16 inches).
 Sinanbartolome - a knife that was popular during the Philippine Revolution. The knife's name was taken from Bartholomew the Apostle whose depiction shows him wielding a knife. It is said that Katipuneros venerated him, a patron of knife makers, and bought many such knives during his feast day. This would later lead to the Cry of Balintawak. Modern-day Tagalog blacksmiths rarely make sinanbartolome or sanbartolome, though there are few ones who knew how to make it and can make specific orders.
 Kris - like other lowlander ethnic groups in the country, Tagalogs also employed the wavy blade called kris. It is not known what's the connection between the modern-day kris that has surviving samples from late Spanish colonial period and the kalis mentioned in Spanish-Tagalog dictionaries of early 17th century. Nevertheless, the modern-day non-Moro kris is distinct from its counterparts from Mindanao, the traditional gangya (guard) is absent in the kris found in Christianized areas of the country.
 Sinampalok - a short sword also found in the Bicol Region. It is named after sampalok (tamarind). It is shaped like a beak and curves downward to the tip similar to ginunting, a traditional blade from Western Visayas.

Ceramics 

Tagalogs practiced pottery since pre-colonial period, many fragments of such potteries were found buried among the dead. These wares are prominent in pre-colonial Tagalog society along with porcelain (kawkawan/kakawan in Tagalog) imported from Chinese traders.

By early Spanish colonial period, Manila and nearby areas became center for pottery production. Pottery produced from these areas were called Manila ware by H. Otley Beyer and produced pottery were dated from 16th century up to early 19th century. These wares are described as pottery, made of terracotta, or semi-stoneware with hard and fine-grained (typically unglazed) appearance in brown, buff or brick-red color. Vases, small jars, bottles and goblets found in archaeological sites in Manila, Cavite and Mindoro were described by Beyer and others as fluted, combed and incised.

Research and investigation discovered that Manila ware pottery were fired at kilns located in present-day Makati, at least three defunct kilns were discovered near the vicinity of Pasig River. Analysis of the patterns describes that these were replicated from the style found in European wares and assumed to be intended for elite market due to Manila-Acapulco galleon.

Papercraft 
Tagalogs in Bulacan practice an art called pabalat, these are colorful Japanese paper cut into intricate designs. These papers are then used as wrappers for pastillas, a traditional Tagalog confection that originated from Bulacan province. Aside from the use as wrapper, pabalat are also used as center pieces during feasts. Pabalat designs vary depending on the maker, but bahay kubo, rice fields, flowers, to landscapes and figures are common motifs.

Architecture 

bahay kubo, bahay na bato, religious architecture (churches, convents, monasteries), precolonial architecture types

Religion 
The Tagalog mostly practice Christianity (majority Catholicism and minority Protestantism) with a minority practicing Islam, Buddhism, indigenous Philippine folk religions (Tagalog religion), and other religions as well as no religion.

Precolonial Tagalog societies were largely animist, alongside a gradual spread of mostly syncretic forms of Islam since roughly the early 16th century. Subsequent Spanish colonization in the latter part of the same century ushered a gradual spread of Roman Catholicism, resulting as the dominant religion today alongside widespread syncretic folk beliefs both mainstream and rural Since the American occupation there is also a small minority of Protestant and Restorationist Christians. Even fewer today are muslim 'reverts' called balik-islam, and revivals of worship to pre-Hispanicized anito.

Anitism 

Most pre-Hispanic Tagalogs at the time of Spanish advent followed indigenous polytheistic and animist beliefs, syncretized primarily with some Hindu-Buddhist and Islamic expressions from a long history of trade with kingdoms and sultanates elsewhere in Southeast Asia. Anitism is the contemporary academic term for these beliefs, which had no documented explicit label among Tagalogs themselves. Many characteristics like the importance of ancestor worship, shamanism, coconuts, swine, fowl, reptilians, and seafaring motifs share similarities with other indigenous animist beliefs not just elsewhere in the Philippines, but also much of maritime Southeast Asia, Taiwanese aboriginal cultures, the Pacific islands, and several Indian Ocean islands.

Bathala is the supreme creator god who sends ancestor spirits and deities called anito as delegates to intervene in earthly affairs, and sometimes as intercessors for invocations on their behalf. Katalonan and the dambana, known also as lambana in the Old Tagalog language.

Abrahamic

Christianity

Roman Catholicism 
Roman Catholicism arrived in Tagalog areas in the Philippines during the late 16th century, starting from the Spanish conquest of the Maynila and its subsequent claim for the Crown. Augustinian friars, later followed by Franciscans, Jesuits, and Dominicans would subsequently establish churches and schools within Intramuros, serving as base for further (but gradual) proselytization to other Tagalog areas and beyond in Luzon. By the 18th century, the majority of Tagalogs are Catholics; indigenous Tagalog religion was largely purged by missionaries, or otherwise undertook Catholic idioms which comprise many syncretic folk beliefs practiced today. The Pista ng Itim na Nazareno (Feast of the Black Nazarene) of Manila is the largest Catholic procession in the nation.

Notable Roman Catholic Tagalogs are St. Lorenzo Ruiz of Manila, Venerable Alfredo Obviar, the cardinals Luis Antonio Cardinal Tagle and Gaudencio Cardinal Rosales.

Protestantism 
A minority of Tagalogs are also members of numerous Protestant and Restorationist faiths such as the Iglesia ni Cristo, the Aglipayans, and other denominations introduced during American rule.

Islam 
A few Tagalogs practice Islam, mostly by former Christians either by study abroad or contact with Moro migrants from the southern Philippines. By the early 16th century, some Tagalogs (especially merchants) were Muslim due to their links with Bruneian Malays. The old Tagalog-speaking Kingdom of Maynila was ruled as a Muslim kingdom, Islam is prominent enough in coastal areas of Tagalog region that Spaniards mistakenly called them "Moros" due to abundance of indications of practicing Muslim faith and their close association with Brunei.

Language and orthography

The language of the Tagalog people evolved from Old Tagalog to Modern Tagalog. Modern Tagalog has five distinct dialects:
 Northern Tagalog (Nueva Ecija, Bulacan, and Bataan) has loanwords from Kapampangan and Ilocano languages.
 Southern Tagalog (Batangas and Quezon, southern Cavite, southeastern Laguna, and eastern Rizal except Tanay) is unique as it necessitate the use of Tagalog without or with some combination of the English language. (While Aurora is in Central Luzon, the Aurora dialect is considered Southern Tagalog dialect as it is closer to Quezon dialect, the reason Aurora was part of Southern Tagalog region; the Aurora-Quezon dialect also has loanwords from Ilocano origin like Northern Tagalog.)
 Central Tagalog (Manila, Cavite, Laguna, and Rizal except Tanay) is predominantly a mixture of Tagalog and English. 
 Tanay Tagalog retains a large fraction of indigenous words not present in other dialects; it is the only highly preserved Tagalog dialect in mainland Luzon and the most endangered Tagalog dialect.
 Marinduque Tagalog dialect is considered the 'purest' of all dialects with preserved Central Philippine languages' features shared with neighboring Visayan languages, with little influence from Spanish and English & strong influence of Bikol and Visayan languages.

Baybayin is the indigenous Tagalog writing system. Few people today know how to read and write in baybayin, yielding the script as nearly extinct. A bill in Congress was filed to make baybayin the country's national script, yet remains pending in the Senate and the House of Representatives. Nowadays, baybayin is artistically expressed in calligraphy, drawing new forms and from old writings.

Colonial period 
The Tagalog people were skilled Spanish speakers from the 18th to 19th centuries due to the Spanish colonial occupation era. When the Americans arrived, English became the most important language in the 20th century. At present-time, the language of the Tagalogs are Tagalog, English, and a mix of the two, known in Tagalog pop culture as Taglish. Some Spanish words are still used by the Tagalog, though sentence construction in Spanish is no longer used. Tagalogs even speak Filipino, being a standardized version of Tagalog, which is spoken as their lingua franca between different dialects.

See also 
Tagalog language

 Tagalog literature
 Filipino language

Ethnic groups in the Philippines

Notes

References

 
Ethnic groups in Luzon
Ethnic groups in the Philippines
History of Manila